"Nadie Como Tú" ("No One Like You") is a song recorded by American singer Leslie Grace. it was released by Top Stop Music on June 23, 2014. She also released a Spanglish remix featuring American rapper Fat Joe.

Charts

References 

2014 singles
Bachata songs
Spanish-language songs
2014 songs